The Sony 9-Pin Protocol or P1 protocol is a two-way communications protocol to control advanced video recorders. Sony introduced this protocol to control  reel-to-reel type C video tape recorders (VTR) as well as videocassette recorders (VCR). It uses an DE-9 D-Sub connector with 9 pins (hence the name), where bi-directional communication takes place over a four wire cable according to the RS-422 standard.

While nowadays all post-production editing is done with a non-linear editing system, in those days editing was done linearly, using  online editing. Editing machines relied heavily on the 9-Pin Protocol to remotely control automatic players and recorders.

Many modern hard disk recorders and solid-state drive recorders can still emulate a 1982 Sony BVW-75 Betacam tape recorder.

Sony's standard also specifies a pinout:

This 9-pin RS-422 pinout has become a de facto standard, used by most brands in the broadcast industry. In the new millennium, RS-422 is slowly phased out in favor of Ethernet for control functions. However its simple way to perform troubleshooting means it will stay around for a long time.

In broadcast automation the Video Disk Control Protocol (VDCP) use the 9-Pin Protocol to playout broadcast programming schedules.

External links
 Sony 9-Pin Remote Protocol (Archived)

References 
Protocol of Remote-1 (9-pin) Connector, 2nd Edition, Sony, document number 9-977-544-13

Communications protocols
Serial buses
Television terminology